Tahmasababad or Tahmasebabad may refer to:
 Tahmasebabad, Ardabil
 Tahmasebabad, Qazvin
 Tahmasababad, Zanjan